The Roman Catholic Diocese of Kitui is a diocese located in the city of Kitui in the Ecclesiastical province of Nairobi in Kenya.

History
 February 20, 1956: Established as Apostolic Prefecture of Kitui from the Diocese of Meru and Metropolitan Archdiocese of Nairobi
 November 16, 1963: Promoted as Diocese of Kitui

Leadership
 Prefects Apostolic of Kitui (Latin Church) 
 Father William Dunne, S.P.S. (1956.10.19 – 1963.11.16); see below
 Bishops of Kitui (Latin Church)
 Bishop William Dunne, S.P.S. (1963.11.16 – 1995.11.02); see above
 Bishop Boniface Lele (1995.11.02 – 2005.04.01), appointed Archbishop of Mombasa
 Bishop Martin Kivuva Musonde (Apostolic Administrator 2007.05 - ?)
 Bishop Anthony Muheria (2008.10.08 - 2017.04.23) (catholic-hierarchy has appointment 2008.06.28), appointed Archbishop of Nyeri
 Bishop Joseph Mwongela (2020.03.17 – present)
Catholic Diocese of Kitui covers the County of Kitui, consisting of four former Administrative Districts of Kyuso, Mwingi, Kitui and Mutomo, an  arid and semi arid area of approximately 30,142 km in Eastern Kenya. It has a population of around 1.09 million people with over 240,000 baptized Catholics (*Source: Central Statistics of the State; Secretariat of State; (2011)

The first Missionaries to evangelize Kitui were Holy Ghost fathers (Congregation of the Holy Spirit) from Kabaa (Machakos diocese) in early 1930s. At the time the Holy Ghost Fathers were introducing Christianity in Kitui, the Consolata Missionaries from Meru were evangelizing in the northern side of Kitui bordering Tharaka, present day Kimangau. The first Mass was celebrated in Museve Hill by a Holy Ghost priest. The first Mission house was built in 1945 at Mutune. Kitui Apostolic Prefecture was carved out from the Archdiocese of Nairobi in 1956 and placed under care of Saint Patrick's Society for the Foreign Missions (also known as the Kiltegan Fathers).  In 1964 it was erected as a diocese on 16 November 1963, with His Lordship, the late Right Rev. William Dunne as the first Bishop (R.I.P) on 9 February 1964. Bishop Dunne retired on 2 November 1995. The first diocesan priests in the diocese were Frs. Peter Muema Kyumbua and Boniface Lele Emeritus Archbishop of Mombasa (RIP), who were ordained in 1974.

Following the retirement of Bishop Dunne, Bishop Boniface Lele was appointed as Bishop of Kitui and ordained as bishop on 2 February 1996 succeeding him.  Archbishop Lele was appointed Archbishop of Archdiocese of Mombasa on 1 April 2005.  Rev. Fr. Paul Healy was the Diocesan Administrator until the appointment of  Rt. Rev. Bishop Martin Kivuva as the Apostolic Administrator. On 28 July 2008, Rt. Rev. Anthony Muheria was appointed bishop of Kitui taking possession on 10 August 2008.

See also
Roman Catholicism in Kenya
Kenya Conference of Catholic Bishops

References

Sources
 GCatholic.org
Catholic Hierarchy
 catholic diocese of Kitui website 

Roman Catholic dioceses in Kenya
Christian organizations established in 1956
Roman Catholic dioceses and prelatures established in the 20th century
1956 establishments in Kenya
Roman Catholic Ecclesiastical Province of Nairobi